The 1976 CFL season is considered to be the 23rd season in modern-day Canadian football, although it is officially the 19th Canadian Football League season.

CFL news in 1976
For the first time in Canadian Football League history, more than two million fans attended CFL games, with a total attendance of 2,029,586.

In the CFL All-Star Game, the East team defeated the West, 27-16, in front of 21,762 fans at Clarke Stadium in Edmonton. The game was played before the pre-season on May 29, the first time a CFL contest was held in the month of May (and the last time until 2018).

Regular season standings

Final regular season standings
Note: GP = Games Played, W = Wins, L = Losses, T = Ties, PF = Points For, PA = Points Against, Pts = Points

Bold text means that they have clinched the playoffs.
Saskatchewan and Ottawa have first round byes.

Grey Cup playoffs

The Ottawa Rough Riders are the 1976 Grey Cup champions, defeating the Saskatchewan Roughriders, 23–20, at Toronto's Exhibition Stadium. This was the third championship game between the two Rough Riders with Ottawa winning two out of three games. Ottawa's Tom Clements (QB) was named the Grey Cup's Most Valuable Player on Offence and Saskatchewan's Cleveland Vann (LB) was named the Grey Cup's Most Valuable Player on Defence. Ottawa's Tony Gabriel (TE) was named Grey Cup's Most Valuable Canadian.

This was the only year between 1973 and 1982 that the Edmonton Eskimos did not appear in the Grey Cup game.

Playoff bracket

CFL Leaders
 CFL Passing Leaders
 CFL Rushing Leaders
 CFL Receiving Leaders

1976 CFL All-Stars

Offence
QB – Ron Lancaster, Saskatchewan Roughriders
RB – Jimmy Edwards, Hamilton Tiger-Cats
RB – Jim Washington, Winnipeg Blue Bombers
SB – Art Green, Ottawa Rough Riders
TE – Tony Gabriel, Ottawa Rough Riders
WR – Rhett Dawson, Saskatchewan Roughriders
WR – George McGowan, Edmonton Eskimos
C – Al Wilson, BC Lions
OG – Ralph Galloway, Saskatchewan Roughriders
OG – Dave Braggins, Montreal Alouettes
OT – Dan Yochum, Montreal Alouettes
OT – Butch Norman, Winnipeg Blue Bombers

Defence
DT – Granville Liggins, Toronto Argonauts
DT – John Helton, Calgary Stampeders
DE – Bill Baker, BC Lions
DE – Junior Ah You, Montreal Alouettes
LB – Harry Walters, Winnipeg Blue Bombers
LB – Mark Kosmos, Ottawa Rough Riders
LB – Roger Goree, Saskatchewan Roughriders
DB – Lorne Richardson, Saskatchewan Roughriders
DB – Brian Herosian, Winnipeg Blue Bombers
DB – Dickie Harris, Montreal Alouettes
DB – David Shaw, Hamilton Tiger-Cats
DB – Paul Williams, Saskatchewan Roughriders
DB – Lewis Porter, Hamilton Tiger-Cats

1976 Eastern All-Stars

Offence
QB – Tom Clements, Ottawa Rough Riders
RB – Jimmy Edwards, Hamilton Tiger-Cats
RB – Andy Hopkins, Montreal Alouettes
SB – Art Green, Ottawa Rough Riders
TE – Tony Gabriel, Ottawa Rough Riders
WR – Mike Eben, Toronto Argonauts
WR – Johnny Rodgers, Montreal Alouettes
C – Donn Smith, Ottawa Rough Riders
OG – Larry Butler, Hamilton Tiger-Cats
OG – Dave Braggins, Montreal Alouettes
OT – Dan Yochum, Montreal Alouettes
OT – Jim Coode, Ottawa Rough Riders

Defence
DT – Glen Weir, Montreal Alouettes
DT – Granville Liggins, Toronto Argonauts
DE – Mike Samples, Hamilton Tiger-Cats
DE – Junior Ah You, Montreal Alouettes
LB – Larry Cameron, Ottawa Rough Riders
LB – Mark Kosmos, Ottawa Rough Riders
LB – Chuck Zapiec, Montreal Alouettes
DB – Steve Dennis, Toronto Argonauts
DB – Phil Price, Montreal Alouettes
DB – Dickie Harris, Montreal Alouettes
DB – David Shaw, Hamilton Tiger-Cats
DB – Larry Uteck, Toronto Argonauts
DB – Lewis Porter, Hamilton Tiger-Cats

1976 Western All-Stars

Offence
QB – Ron Lancaster, Saskatchewan Roughriders
RB – Mike Strickland, BC Lions
RB – Jim Washington, Winnipeg Blue Bombers
RB – Steve Beaird, Winnipeg Blue Bombers
TE – Bob Richardson, Saskatchewan Roughriders
WR – Rhett Dawson, Saskatchewan Roughriders
WR – George McGowan, Edmonton Eskimos
C – Al Wilson, BC Lions
OG – Ralph Galloway, Saskatchewan Roughriders
OG – Buddy Brown, Winnipeg Blue Bombers
OT – Layne McDowell, BC Lions
OT – Butch Norman, Winnipeg Blue Bombers

Defence
DT – Tim Roth, Saskatchewan Roughriders
DT – John Helton, Calgary Stampeders
DE – Bill Baker, BC Lions
DE – George Wells, Saskatchewan Roughriders
LB – Harry Walters, Winnipeg Blue Bombers
LB – Bill Manchuk, Saskatchewan Roughriders
LB – Roger Goree, Saskatchewan Roughriders
DB – Lorne Richardson, Saskatchewan Roughriders
DB – Brian Herosian, Winnipeg Blue Bombers
DB – Joe Hollimon, Edmonton Eskimos
DB – Ken McEachern, Saskatchewan Roughriders
DB – Paul Williams, Saskatchewan Roughriders

1976 CFL Awards
CFL's Most Outstanding Player Award – Ron Lancaster (QB), Saskatchewan Roughriders
CFL's Most Outstanding Canadian Award – Tony Gabriel (TE), Ottawa Rough Riders
CFL's Most Outstanding Defensive Player Award – Bill Baker (DE), BC Lions
CFL's Most Outstanding Offensive Lineman Award – Dan Yochum (OT), Montreal Alouettes
CFL's Most Outstanding Rookie Award – John Sciarra (QB), BC Lions
CFLPA's Outstanding Community Service Award – George Reed (RB), Saskatchewan Roughriders
CFL's Coach of the Year – Bob Shaw, Hamilton Tiger-Cats

References 

CFL
Canadian Football League seasons